Jacob Preus, more completely Jacob Aall Ottesen Preus, is the name of three generations of important American Lutherans:

J. A. O. Preus (1883-1961), politician, Governor of Minnesota from 1921 to 1925
J. A. O. Preus II (1920-1994), theologian, President of the Lutheran Church - Missouri Synod from 1969 to 1981
J. A. O. Preus III (born 1953), theologian, President of Concordia University, Irvine, California

See also
Preus, more people with the same surname